= Traveling with Sugar =

2019 book by Amy Moran-Thomas

Traveling with Sugar: Chronicles of a Global Epidemic
- Authors: Amy Moran-Thomas
- Language: English
- Subjects: Anthropology
- Publisher: University of California Press
- Publication date: 2019
- Publication place: United States
- Media type: Print (hardcover, paperback)
- Pages: 384
- Awards: Foundation for the Sociology of Health & Illness' Book of the Year Prize (2021); Victor Turner Prize in Ethnographic Writing (2021)
- ISBN: 978-0520297548

Traveling with Sugar: Chronicles of a Global Epidemic is a 2019 book by the anthropologist Amy Moran-Thomas, published by University of California Press. The book is an ethnography about living with diabetes in Belize, including attention to social and historical issues connected to sugar. Through the book, Moran-Thomas makes the argument to think about diabetes and sugar within the broader context of colonialism, environmental harm, dispossession, and racism. The book received the 2021 Foundation for the Sociology of Health & Illness' Book Prize in addition to the Victor Turner Prize in Ethnographic Writing.

== Description ==
Moran-Thomas conducted ethnographic fieldwork in Belize at diabetes clinics and at the homes of people with diabetes. The book focuses on people of indigenous and African descent. Moran-Thomas engages with Belize's tourism-dependent economy, the history of the sugar industry in Belize and the wider Caribbean, and the implications of dispossession in the country. Through the book, Moran-Thomas makes an argument to treat traumas connected to colonialism, poverty, and racism as part of the etiology of diabetes.

== Reception ==
Emily Yates-Doerr, reviewing the book in Medical Anthropology Quarterly, said that "It will stimulate important discussions on anthropological methods and ethnographic writing" and suggested that "readers are likely to be left with vexing questions about the limited possibilities of ethnography to intervene upon disaster and how to best write about trauma in academic texts." Yates-Doerr wrote that the book offers "poetic reflection on the material forces of history" and said that Moran-Thomas "weaves together bioecological time and social geography" through the work.

Chu J Hsiao, writing in the New Florida Journal of Anthropology, described the book as "an insightful reflection on the state of normal for those living with diabetes". Hsiao said that "Moran-Thomas reminds us of the need for anthropologists to illuminate the ongoing struggles that may be deemed ordinary and unworthy of attention" Hsiao summarised that the book is "an excellent example of a strong ethnography grounded in careful observation" and said that Moran-Thomas "humanized both those who need care and those trying to provide that care".

April Merleaux, in a review for Bulletin of the History of Medicine, said that the book "has much to offer historians of disease and public health generally as well as scholars interested specifically in diabetes, sugar production, health technologies, and food politics". Merleaux wrote that Moran-Thomas describes "how people's bodies archive the violence of sugar and the economic, environmental, and racial systems that have produced it".

Alyshia Gálvez, in a review for the Journal of the History of Medicine and Allied Sciences, said that the book is "a discipline altering tour-de-force" that "will be of profound relevance to historians of medicine, medical sociologists and anthropologists, scholars of Latin America, the Caribbean and the greater Black Atlantic". Gálvez concluded that "Moran-Thomas presents a fresh perspective on a disease so common, so mundane, that it is deeply misunderstood, if not overlooked entirely".

=== Awards ===
- Foundation for the Sociology of Health & Illness' Book Prize (2021).
- The Society for Humanistic Anthropology's Victor Turner Prize in Ethnographic Writing (2021).
